Jorge Rodríguez-Gerada is a Cuban-American Contemporary Artist. Born in Cuba on 5th February 1966, and raised in the United States. He predominantly creates work in urban spaces on a large scale. He was a founding member of the early 1990s New York culture jamming movement working first with the group ‘Artfux’ and later with the 'Cicada Corps of Artists.' During this period he also launched interventions upon billboards and public advertising. By 1997 he began to move towards solo work. In 2002 Rodríguez-Gerada moved to Barcelona where he focused on the large-scale ephemeral charcoal drawings, which comprise his Identity Series. He then developed the Terrestrial Series; ephemeral earthworks so expansive as to be visible from space. Other ongoing projects include the Identity Composite Series, and smaller artworks he calls Fragment Series, Urban Analogies, and Memorylythics. Since 2009 he has curated the annual AvantGuard Urbano Festival; a small Urban Art Festival with big names, held in Tudela, Navarre, in Northern Spain. He also takes part in numerous shows and exhibitions.

Early years

Jorge Rodríguez-Gerada immigrated with his family from Cuba to the US in 1970, to settle in North Plainfield, New Jersey. It wasn't until his twenties that he realized that the move was because his parents did not want him and his two elder brothers to grow up under the then newly implemented system of control in Cuba. His father spent three years cutting sugar cane in order to gain visas.

Rodríguez-Gerada was one of the first Hispanic immigrants to enroll in the local school system . This assertion is directly contested by a North Plainfield resident who attended the same school within the district during the same time-frame. There he was bullied for being Spanish, so he rebelled against speaking it in order to fit in with the other children.His fascination with how we form our identity is something he links to his experiences as a child. In the U.S school system he saw children from many different backgrounds thrown into the ‘melting pot’, which has been said to leave children from immigrant backgrounds lost in a cultural limbo as adults. Again, the North Plainfield resident cited above re-asserts that North Plainfield, NJ during the 1960s and 1970s was a typical American town. There was nothing unique about its assimilation to American culture. For immigrant Americans, regardless of origin, the environment naturally causes a clash between old and new culture that existed then and still exists.

As a boy he was interested in creating things; he always had a love of drawing and got very involved in art whilst at high school. Since the age of sixteen he started spending time in Manhattan. Speaking of his influences he said:

‘I was surrounded by theater, music and art that was breaking barriers and it seemed natural that I should want to do the same’

He studied at Jersey City State College (now New Jersey City University) where he met the future members of ‘Artfux’. The media was very interested in their activity, the group realized there were issues that could benefit from this type of attention. They decided to join as ‘Artfux’ and continue producing controversial artwork together.

Culture Jamming

Artfux started by illegally altering billboards and staging socially charged street actions and performances.  But it was their billboard alterations that had the most coherent goal and plan of action in order to effect change. They targeted the disproportionately high amount of damaging products (get drunk quick beverages and menthol cigarette brands) being advertised in poor areas.

Coinciding with their ‘ad-busting’ was a wave of black and Latino communities coming together against cigarette and alcohol advertising. The communities accused these companies of exploiting black poverty by target –marketing inner cities for their lethal product. The Reverend Calvin O. Butts would take his parishioners on ‘bill-board busting’ missions and they would simply paint over the cigarette or alcohol adverts around their church with white paint.

Whilst the Reverend Calvin O. Butts method was effective Rodríguez-Gerada, with Artfux, sought more creative ways to undermine the billboard consumption messages: by turning them into political messages of their own with ‘clever/cute’ interventions. That way they could borrow the legitimacy of the advertising itself and still reach the same audience the adverts were originally targeting.
For example, Rodríguez-Gerada would morph the faces of cigarette models so they looked rancid and diseased. He then replaced the standard Surgeon General's warning with his own messages: ‘Struggle General’s warning: Black and Latinos are the prime scapegoats for illegal drugs, and the prime target for legal ones’. With a deft détournement (an image message or artefact lifted out of its context to create a new meaning) a jammed ad might now speak about the negative effects of those products. Press releases were then sent out with photos of the exploits. Every time a newspaper, magazine or newscast gave them the platform to address these social ills Artfux considered it a victory.

Culture jamming is seen as a part of the backlash against the brands, which was to do with specific issues; the loss of public space, corporate censorship and unethical labour practices.

Rodríguez-Gerada hoped to use his culture jammed billboards to open up a dialogue with the community. where there had only been a statement.

‘Culture jamming baldly rejects the idea that marketing- because it buys its way into our public spaces- must be passively accepted as a one-way information flow.’

As a culture jammer he used the pseudo name ‘Artjammer’.

Following the break up of Artfux Rodríguez-Gerada joined the Cicada Crops of artists, with whom he continued to culture jam. He soon extended his critiques beyond tobacco and alcohol ads to include rampant ad bombardment and commercialism in general.

By 1997, when Klein interviewed Jorge Rodríguez-Gerada, he was beginning to move away from working with a collective, and starting to experiment with more urban projects by altering street signs as well.
He had become disillusioned with the culture jamming movement. Its success was so great that culture jamming's very ability to undermine those ads became negated. Instead the brands gained more attention, and the advertisers began to culture jam their own ads to bring attention to themselves, absorbing the aesthetics of the movement into their advertising.

‘Marketers have always extracted symbols and signs from the resistance movements of their day’ (No Logo)

Identity Series

In 2002, around the time that Jorge Rodríguez-Gerada moved to Barcelona, he began to create large charcoal portrait drawings of anonymous locals, covering the size of large exterior urban walls. They are ephemeral in nature; the properties of charcoal allow them to fade with the elements or disappear with the destruction of the wall.

He borrows the same scale, location and iconic approach as urban advertising to undermine much of what that stands for. The momentum gained from such attention is directed towards social issues, instead of advertising. Rather than a famous face that sells something, Rodríguez-Gerada chooses random locals who sell nothing. By raising them in a public space he wants to question the controls imposed on those public spaces, preconceptions of where art is permitted and to whom it is directed. Their impermanence defies imposition on the space.

Having selected a person who has a strong attachment to the area where the piece will be created, Rodríguez-Gerada photographs their face to create a mock-up. He then starts to create a hyper realistic drawing on the sides of the building. Initially he used ladders and scaffolding, but he now creates his giant drawings with hydraulic lifts. Each piece might take up to a week of intense effort, and may last from only two to six months, leaving no negative impact on the environment.

Documentation of the process begins with finding the protagonist, continues with the act of creating the drawings, and finally ends with chronicling the disappearance, so that the finished drawing is not necessarily the pinnacle of the piece:

‘The memory that is left confirms the importance and fragility of every existence. My intent is to have identity, place and memory become one.’

Poetic concept lies in the celebration of individual identity, as opposed to one dictated by brands or fashion. With dignity they also remind us of our transience.

Identity Composite Series

Complementary to the Identity Series, Rodríguez-Gerada has developed The Identity Composite Series. With help from the Autonomous University of Barcelona which has developed an algorithm programme, he has been able to create the composite face of the demographics of a city based on multiple 3D facial scans.
As an artist in residence at the Autonomous University of Barcelona he created the first Composite Identity based on 100 faces in the demographics of that area in 2009. The resultant portrait was drawn in charcoal on an exterior wall surface in the area.
In 2010 he created an Identity Composite for Badalona, Spain, using 3D scans of 34 faces, from the 34 different neighborhoods in Badalona. It too became a charcoal portrait, which graced a Badalona wall.
Rodríguez-Gerada hopes to use the multidisciplinary project to create monumental sculptures as well as murals, in different cities
‘that mirror each location’s idiosyncrasy and population.’

Memorylithics

Memorylithics is a sculpture series made using old architectural elements such as stone and bricks. The finished piece involves the history of the found materials used to create it.

Terrestrial Series

Rodríguez-Gerada's earth works in the Terrestrial series are designed on such a spectacular scale that they may be viewed through Google Earth or even photographed by passing satellites. The location, scale and material tend to emphasise what he is trying to say with each project, which in essence is driven by empathy for the individual. As with the Identity Series, they are ephemeral and the materials used do not have a negative impact on the environment.
Each work is put together using a vector image and GPS technology so that they can then be mapped out on the ground.
He intends the enormity of the process, involving so many people coming together to create something positive, to raise the spirit of each project beyond the completion of the artwork.

Expectation

Jorge Rodríguez-Gerada's first Terrestrial work was Expectation, a giant ephemeral sand portrait of Barack Obama on a beachfront in Barcelona, Spain. It was designed to be viewed from space by Google Earth. On 3 November 2008, the day before the U.S elections, the Expectation project was presented at a press conference in Barcelona.
The work was created using a vector graph and approximately 650 tons of sand and gravel covering an area 120 by 80 metre wide. It was supported by volunteers, who completed the work despite poor weather conditions. It was administered by the Forum de las Culturas, Barcelona.

Through its scale and location, the project was visualized to reflect the global impact of the elections. 
Rodríguez-Gerada said that having it made from sand and gravel was like making a giant mandala to pray for change but also alludes to how the hope could fade away, as the sand eventually did.

Homage to Enric Miralles

To commemorate the Catalan architect Enric Miralles on the tenth anniversary of his death, Rodríguez-Gerada created a portrait of his face using sand, which was then transformed and undone on 3 July 2010. Located ijn Barcelona, it was a giant mandala in homage to the architect. Miralles died at the age of 44 but his work left a remarkable legacy. His wife, architect Benedetta Tagliabue and their studio EMBT, organized the work and a picnic for family and friends.

Gal-La

The GAL-LA project was created as part of the first planetary art exhibits called ‘eARTh’ curated by 350.org, which brought together artists from over 16 countries to make art that was visible from space. Each gigantic piece was created to highlight a particular issue related to Climate Change in response to the 2010 2010 United Nations Climate Change Conference in Cancun, Mexico. The number 350 refers to the parts per million CO2 reduction target proposed by scientists to combat climate change. Designed as a sun stencil, the piece was made to bring attention to the problem of sunlight/ heat that cannot escape back into space because of greenhouse gases.

Rodríguez-Gerada chose a little girl named Gal-la who lives in the Delta del Ebro and created this icon in her likeness; 'an icon to symbolize all the reasons for the world to act today'. The shadows cast by the temporary sheets between the posts picked out details of the girl's face and hair. Her portrait was constructed using a labyrinth design to allude to the tenacity of the human spirit to find a solution.
As he stated: ‘ By giving importance to each life, I want to give importance to empathy.’
Gal-La was chosen to be included on day 96 in Vivienne Westwood's online installations collection of ‘100 days of Active Resistance’, a concept born from her manifesto to encourage the pursuit of culture and art to provide an antidote to propaganda.

Mama cash

For the Mama Cash project Rodríguez-Gerada created a portrait of the face of a fierce feminist activist, spanning almost two football fields on Zeeburghereiland, Amsterdam, in winter 2012. With the help of 80 volunteers the face was constructed in under a week using almost five miles of rope, seven tons of straw, 5300 cubic feet of soil and 1150 wooden poles. The portrait was to remain for one year.
Rodríguez-Gerada had been invited to Amsterdam to create a piece for the International Human Rights Day, to help launch ‘Vogelvrije Vrouwen’ (‘Defend Women who defend human rights’), a campaign to raise awareness of the plight of Mesoamerican women who are illegally targeted and terrorized for defending human rights in that region. Mama Cash, a feminist foundation, commissioned the work.

He said ‘ I chose to use fertile soil to create this piece as a metaphor for what can come forth from the vision of these women if it is respected and allowed to bring about change.’

Wish

As Belfast Festival at Queen's first artist in residence, Rodríguez-Gerada created the UK and Ireland's largest portrait to date, Wish, in October 2013. The ephemeral portrait of a young girl making a wish covers eleven acres of the Titanic Quarter of Belfast. Approximately 30,000 wooden pegs, 2,000 tons of soil, 2,000 tons of sand, as well as grass, stones and strings were used to make the portrait. Adjacent buildings allowed viewings until December 2013, but it was most comfortably viewed by aerial or satellite photo. Wish took eighteen months to plan and one month to execute, with the help of a huge team of volunteers. As Rodríguez-Gerada had envisaged, the Belfast community actively collaborated with and supported the project, from construction companies such as MacLaughlin Harvey to the fire brigade.
The portrait is based on a photo of an anonymous six-year-old girl from Belfast that the artist took on one of his many trips to get to know the city during the months of planning.
Rodríguez-Gerada wanted to lift the pure moment of a child's wish to the magnitude of a universal statement, particularly in the context of a city like Belfast. For the artist it was the enormity of people coming together in support on such a large scale that amplified such a simple moment to a profound level.

Out of Many, One

Out of Many, One is a "facescape" created on commission for The Smithsonian's National Portrait Gallery at the National Mall in Washington, DC and inaugurated on 1 October 2014. The piece is Rodriguez-Gerada's first Terrestrial project in the United States, it measures a staggering six acres and is located between the World War II Memorial and Lincoln Memorial. It was made using 2,000 tons of sand, 800 tons of soil, 10,000 wooden pegs, and 8 miles of string. The temporary piece was open to the public in October 2014, during which visitors could walk through the portrait or view it from above in the Washington Monument.

The portrait doesn't depict any one person, it represents the diversity of the American people through a composite portrait created by photographing numerous young men of different ethnic backgrounds at the National Mall.  The title, Out of Many, One, is translated from the Latin E pluribus unum, a phrase on the Seal of the United States, which was central in conveying unity in the newly formed United States. Rodríguez-Gerada says, "Diversity is the backbone of the nation, and this piece embraces that fact. I decided to create the face of a young adult male because I want to talk about the reality of this demographic group in the U.S. Nothing affects us more than the arbitrary nature of identity. We are judged immediately by preconceptions about how we look and where we come from. For minorities, the reality is still harsh."

The venture was a landmark project for the National Portrait Gallery. The gallery director, Kim Sajet, said "We're moving into a new age of what a National Portrait Gallery is, what it does, and how it can change people". Bob Vogel, the National Mall and Memorial Parks Superintendent, explains "Out of Many, One reflects what the National Mall stands for—democracy, diversity and freedom of expression. It will provide visitors with a unique national park experience and, in keeping with our mission, will improve the soil for better turf in the future. These benefits would not be possible without this unique partnership."

References

Bibliography
 Blackshaw, Farrelly, Ric, Liz, The Street Art Book, 60 Artists in their own words, New York, Harper Collins, 2008
 Gavin, Francesca, Street Renegades: New Underground Street Art, London, Lawrence King publishing Ltd, 2007
 Klein, Naomi, No Logo, London, Fourth Estate, 2010
 Scott, Thomas, Designing Obama: A Chronicle of Art and Design from the 2008 Presidential Campaign, U.S.A, thepostpress.com, 2010,
 Westwood, Vivienne, 100 Days of Active Resistance, Bologne, Grafiche Damiane, 2011

External links
 Curbs and StoopsJorge Rodriguez Gerada Interview | Curbs and Stoops
 http://www.jorgerodriguezgerada.com
 Avant Garde Urbano – Tudela De Navarra, Spain – Sept. 30 thru Oct. 4
 Jorge Rodriguez-Gerada: The A’s To Our Q’s | Wooster Collective
 Jorge Rodriguez Gerada Interview
 Curbs and StoopsJorge Rodriguez Gerada Interview | Curbs and Stoops
 ISSUU – Flic Magazine Issue#5 by Flic Magazine
 Jorge Rodriguez Gerada | MoTA
 http://www.fecalface.com/SF/video-clipoday/2961-identitys-the-face-of-badalona--composite-identity--jorge-rodriguez-gerada
 Jorge Rodriguez-Gerada’s Tribute to Spanish Architect Enric Miralles | Wooster Collective
 http://inhabitat.com/jorge-rodriguez-gerada-uses-the-earth-as-his-canvas-for-a-giant-portrait-of-president-obama/jorge-rodriguez-gerada3/
 DAILY SERVING » Fan Mail: Jorge Rodriguez-Gerada
 Jorge Rodríguez-Gerada and Mama Cash Collaborate on Terrestrial Land Art Series | Complex
 Dutch Promote Women's Rights With a Massive Portrait
 http://arrestedmotion.com/2013/01/jorge-rodriguez-gerada-terrestrial-series/
 How Belfast got stuck in to make artist Jorge Rodriguez-Gerada's Wish come true – BelfastTelegraph.co.uk
 https://web.archive.org/web/20131029215746/http://downloads.bbc.co.uk/podcasts/northernireland/queensfestival/queensfestival_20131017-1205b.mp3
 https://elemmental.com/2021/11/29/jorge-rodriguez-gerada-entrevista/

Living people
Cuban emigrants to the United States
Artists from New York City
People from North Plainfield, New Jersey
Cuban artists
1966 births